Noida Media Club (NMC) is a social organization of journalists from Noida and across Delhi-NCR in India. Pankaj Parashar was elected President in 2018. The organization's motto संगच्छध्वं संवदध्वं is taken from the Rigveda. The meaning of the motto is "We all go together, speak together, let our minds be one".

Social Contribution 
The objective of the organization is to protect the social, economic and professional rights of journalists. The institution is making efforts to strengthen the professional skills of journalists working in Noida and Delhi-NCR and want to play an active role in making Noida a better city.

Free Speech Magazine
The Free Speech Magazine is the bilingual (Hindi and English) mouthpiece of NMC. A half early publication of the organization and contains articles from various fraternities such as journalists, peace makers, businessmen, civil servants, politicians and social workers.

The first edition of the magazine was released by Harivansh Narayan Singh, the Deputy Chairman of Rajya Sabha on 2 October 2019 on the occasion 150th birthday anniversary of Mahatma Gandhi.

Free Speech Award 
NMC established the Free Speech Award to recognise journalists whom the organisation considers are contributing outstanding efforts in journalism. Awarded annually, the award has two categories - journalists and photo journalists - with Gold, Silver and Bronze given in each.

Journalist's Memorial 
NMC is constructing a national memorial dedicated to journalists who lost their lives in line of duty during the COVID-19 pandemic. The foundation stone of the memorial has been laid on January 2, 2022. Names of more than 500 such journalists, including those from print and video, will be inscribed on memorial pillars at the site located in Sector 72 of Noida.

References

Indian journalism organisations
Organizations with year of establishment missing